Vvedenskaya Gotnya is a rural locality (a selo) and the administrative center of Vvedeno-Gotnyanskoye Rural Settlement, Rakityansky District, Belgorod Oblast, Russia. The population was 431 as of 2010. There are 12 streets.

Geography 
Vvedenskaya Gotnya is located 14 km southeast of Rakitnoye (the district's administrative centre) by road. Trefilovka is the nearest rural locality.

References 

Rural localities in Rakityansky District